James Montgomery McAlpine (28 June 1887 – October qtr. 1948) was a Scottish footballer, who played as a half back for Southampton in the Southern League before playing for Football League clubs Millwall and Gillingham.

Football career
Born in Dalziel, (Motherwell, Lanarkshire), McAlpine played for various local clubs, including Strathclyde where he was spotted by scouts from Southampton. Along with teammate Andrew Gibson, he signed for the Saints in May 1911 and was considered to be one of new manager George Swift's better signings. Swift was Southampton's first appointment as manager and promptly embarked on a spending spree, signing eleven players in six weeks.

Playing alongside the ever-dependable Bert Lee, he became a virtual ever-present up to the suspension of football in 1915. According to Holley & Chalk's "The Alphabet of the Saints", McAlpine was "rather small for a left half, (but) made up for his lack of stature with a determined and forceful temperament that made him a firm favourite with the Saints crowd."

During World War I he remained on Saints' books, but joined local shipbuilders Harland and Wolff and turned out for their works football team, often against the Saints. He briefly returned to his native Scotland, playing for Kilmarnock and Wishaw Thistle.

After the war he moved to Millwall where he was part of their first ever Football League side in 1920–21. In July 1921 he moved on to Gillingham for a couple of seasons before retiring.

References

1887 births
1948 deaths
Scottish footballers
Southampton F.C. players
Kilmarnock F.C. wartime guest players
Wishaw Thistle F.C. players
Millwall F.C. players
Gillingham F.C. players
Southern Football League players
Scottish Football League players
English Football League players
Footballers from Motherwell
Association football wing halves
Scottish Junior Football Association players
Strathclyde F.C. players
Vale of Clyde F.C. players